Marginellinae is a taxonomic subfamily within the larger family of Marginellidae, a group of small sea snails, marine gastropod molluscs in the superfamily Volutoidea.

Genera
Abbreviations and conventions:
 † - (preceding the genus), denotes extinct genus
 † - (following species), denotes fossil species
 (M) - original designation by monotype
 OD -  original designation
 OD (M) - original designation as type species, but also monotypic
 SD - subsequent designation as type
 SD (M) - subsequent designation as type species, but also monotypic
 T - original designation by tautonomy

In the systematic list, the following sequence is used for each generic synonym:
 Genus in original combination, followed by author, year, page number(s)
 Designation  of type species followed by author, year, page number(s)
 Reference only to Type species

Marginellidae Fleming, 1828:328

Subfamily MARGINELLINAE Fleming, 1828:328
Genus  † Myobarbum Sohl, 1963

Tribe AUSTROGINELLINI Coovert and Coovert, 1995:80

"Serrata Group"

Genus † Conuginella Laseron, 1957:288
Marginella inermis Tate, 1878 †; OD (M)
Genus Serrata Jousseaume, 1875:167
Serrata serrata (Gaskoin, 1849), = Marginella serrata Gaskoin, 1849;T
Genus Serrataginella Coovert and Coovert, 1995:82
Marginella spryi (Clover, 1974), OD (M)
Genus Stromboginella Laseron, 1957:289
Marginella crassidens Chapman and Crespin, 1928 †;  OD (M)
Genus Hydroginella Laseron, 1957:284
Hydroginella dispersa Laseron, 1957;  OD (M)

"Austroginella Group"

Genus † Mioginella Laseron, 1957:287
Marginella regula Cotton, 1949 †; OD (M)

Genus Protoginella Laseron, 1957:285
Marginella lavigata Brazier, 1877, = Marginella (Prunum) lavigata  Brazier, 1877; OD (M)
Genus † Nudifaba Eames, 1952:122
Marginella (N.) rakhiensis Eames, 1952 †; OD (M)
Genus Alaginella Laseron, 1957:286
Marginella ochracea Angas, 1871; OD
Genus † Hiwia Marwick, 1931:129
Marginella (Hiwia) amplificata Marwick, 1931 †; OD (M)
Genus Austroginella Laseron, 1957:285
Marginella muscaria Lamarck, 1822; OD
Genus Mesoginella Laseron, 1957:282
Marginella turbinata G. B. Sowerby II, 1846; OD (M)
Genus Closia Gray, 1857:36
Closia sarda (Kiener, 1834), = Marginella sarda Kiener, 1834; M
Genus Ovaginella Laseron, 1957
Marginella ovulum G. B. Sowerby II, 1846; OD
Genus Balanetta Jousseaume, 1875
Balanetta baylei Jousseaume, 1875; M

Tribe PRUNINI Coovert and Coovert, 1995:80

Genus Volvarina Hinds, 1844:75
Marginella nitida Hinds, 1844, = Marginella (Volvarina) nitida Hinds, 1844, = Voluta mitrella Risso, 1826; SD Redfield, 1870:221
Genus Prunum Herrmannsen, 1852:113
Voluta prunum Gmelin, 1791; M
Genus Bullata Jousseaume, 1875:167, 250
Bullata bullata (Born, 1778), = Voluta bullata Born, 1778; T
Genus Rivomarginella Brandt, 1968:275
Rivomarginella morrisoni Brandt 1968; OD (M)
Genus Cryptospira Hinds, 1844:76
Marginella tricincta Hinds, 1844, = Marginella (Cryptospira) tricincta Hinds, 1844; SD (M) Gray, 1847:142
Genus Hyalina Schumacher, 1817:234
Hyalina pellucida Schumacher, 1817, = Bulla pallida Linné, 1758; M

Tribe MARGINELLINI Fleming, 1828:328

Genus † Stazzania Sacco, 1890a:138
Marginella (Stazzania) emarginata Sismonda, 1847, = Marginella emarginata Sismonda, 1847 †; M
Genus Dentimargo Cossmann, 1899:90
'Marginella dentifera Lamarck, 1803  †; OD
Genus Eratoidea Weinkauff, 1879:140Marginella margarita Kiener, 1834; SD Cossmann, 1899:87
Genus † Euryentome Cossmann, 1899:95: the fossil genus Euryentome is proposed as a junior synonym of Serrata Jousseaume, 1875 Marginella crassilabra Conrad, 1833 (non Marginella crassilabar Bory de St. Vincent, 1827), = Marginella silabra Palmer, 1937 (nom. nov.), = Marginella aratina Lea, 1833 †; OD
Genus Gibbacousteau Espinosa & Ortea, 2013
Genus † Simplicoglabella Sacco, 1890b:21Marginella (Glabella) taurinensis Michelotti, 1847 †; SD (M)
Genus Marginella Lamarck, 1799:70Voluta glabella Linné, 1758; M
Genus Glabella Swainson, 1840:133Voluta faba Linné, 1758; SD (M) Gray, 1847:142

 References 

 Fleming J. (1828).  A history of British animals, exhibiting the descriptive characters and systematical arrangement of the genera and species of quadrupeds, birds, reptiles, fishes, mollusca, and radiata of the United Kingdom; including the indigenous, extirpated, and extinct kinds, together with periodical and occasional visitants. Edinburg : i–xxiii + 1–565.
 Coan E. V. (1965). "A Proposed Reclassification of the Family Marginellidae". The Veliger 7 (3): 184-194.
 Coovert G. A. & Coovert H. K. (1995). "Revision of the Supraspecific Classification of Marginelliform Gastropods". The Nautilus'' 109(2-3): 43-110. (latest family review)

External links
 Bouchet, P., Rocroi, J.-P. (2005). Classification and nomenclator of gastropod families. Malacologia. 47(1-2): 1-397. .

 
Taxa named by John Fleming (naturalist)